Götterspeise (literally: dish / fare of the gods) is the German name for a dessert made of gelatine or other gelling agent, sugar, flavourings and food colouring, it is similar or identical to jelly or jello and other gelatin desserts. Götterspeise is usually eaten with whipped cream or vanilla sauce. The best-known flavours are the following:

 Woodruff (Waldmeister) – green
 Raspberry (Himbeere) – red
 Cherry (Kirsche) – red
 Lemon (Zitrone) – yellow

The green Götterspeise is not coloured with woodruff, the latter only gives the dessert its characteristic aroma. Because the coumarin contained in woodruff is toxic, only artificial woodruff flavouring is used in the trade.

A special type of Götterspeise is the triple-layered and three-coloured (red, yellow and green) Ampelpudding ("traffic light pudding"), which is made using three layers of separately cooled flavours.

Food colouring 
Götterspeise is usually coloured with artificial food colouring, azo compounds often being used. 
 red colouring: azorubine (E 122), cochineal red A (E 124), brilliant blue FCF (E 133)
 yellow colouring: sunset yellow FCF (E 110), Quinoline Yellow WS (E 104)
 green colouring: Quinoline Yellow WS (E 104), patent blue V (E 131), sunset yellow FCF (E 110)

Origin of the name Wackelpeter 
The name  has its origins in the 19th century, when the name "Peter" was often used as a nickname to describe something humorously (see also Hackepeter and Struwwelpeter). Moreover, the gelatine mass of the pudding wobbles (wackelt) when shaken.  or  also means a pudding.

See also

Almond jelly
Gummy candies
Jelly bean
Jell-O
Knox gelatin
Jello salad, a variation on gelatin desserts that include other ingredients

References 

Puddings
Gelatin
German desserts
German puddings